Talegalla is a genus of bird in the family Megapodiidae. First described by René Primevère Lesson in 1828, it contains the following species:
 Red-billed brushturkey (Talegalla cuvieri)
 Black-billed brushturkey (Talegalla fuscirostris)
 Collared brushturkey (Talegalla jobiensis)

The name Talegalla is a combination of taleve, the French word for swamphen, and gallus, the Latin word for "cock". Lesson wrote that he created the word to hint at the unusual appearance of the red-billed brushturkey, which somewhat resembles a swamphen but is the size of a chicken.

References

 
Bird genera
 
Taxa named by René Lesson
Taxonomy articles created by Polbot